This is a list of international visits undertaken by Rex Tillerson (in office 2017–2018) while serving as the United States Secretary of State. The list includes both private travel and official state visits. The list includes only foreign travel which the Secretary made during his tenure in the position.

Table

References 

2017 beginnings
2018 endings
2010s in international relations
2010s politics-related lists
United States Secretary of State
S
United States diplomacy-related lists
|Tillerson
2010s timelines